Lazarevski is a common Macedonian surname. Notable people with the surname include:

Dimitrija Lazarevski (born 1982), Macedonian footballer
Goran Lazarevski (born 1974), Macedonian football midfielder
Nenad Lazarevski (born 1986), Serbian footballer
Vlade Lazarevski (born 1983), Macedonian footballer

See also
Lazarev
Lazar (disambiguation)
Lazarevsky

Macedonian-language surnames